Phthira was a mountain in ancient Caria, inhabited by the Phthires, a non-Greek people. It is evidently the same as the Phtheiron oros (Φθειρῶν ὄρος) called "wood-crowned" by Homer in the Iliad, which, according to Hecataeus, was identical with Mount Latmus, but which others supposed to be the same as Mount Grium, running parallel to Mount Latmus.

References

Caria
Locations in the Iliad